Garden Springs is a neighborhood in Southwestern Lexington, Kentucky, United States. Its boundaries are Georgian Way to the west, Lane Allen Road to the north, Harrodsburg Road to the east, and New Circle Road to the south. Turfland Mall and the Lexington campus of Sullivan University are located in the neighborhood.

In the 2000 census it had a population of 3,734.

Neighborhood statistics
 Area: 
 Population: 3,734
 Population density: 3,665 people per square mile
 Median Household Income: $41,287

Public school districts
 Garden Springs Elementary School
 Beaumont Middle School
 Paul Laurence Dunbar High School (Lexington, Kentucky)

External links
 http://www.city-data.com/neighborhood/Garden-Springs-Lexington-KY.html

Neighborhoods in Lexington, Kentucky